Philip Shirley (1913–1998) was a businessman, who held senior positions with the British Transport Commission, British Rail Board and Cunard in the United Kingdom and the Public Transport Commission in Australia.

Life and career
Philip Shirley was born in Australia in 1912, before emigrating to England in 1936. In 1958 he became the chairman of Batchelors. After being appointed to the British Transport Commission in 1961, he became the vice-chairman of the British Rail Board under Richard Beeching in 1964. He was appointed chairman of Cunard in 1968.

Having retired, in 1972 Shirley returned to Australia, having been appointed the inaugural chairman of the Public Transport Commission, becoming the highest paid public servant in New South Wales. Appointed for a five-year term, Shirley resigned in November 1975 and returned to England. Shirley earned the ire of railfans enforcing bans on steam locomotives operating on the main line in both the United Kingdom and Australia.

References

British Rail people
British Transport Commission
Public servants of New South Wales
1913 births
1998 deaths
Australian emigrants to the United Kingdom